Blagonravov is a surname of Russian origin. The feminine form is Blagonravova. People with this name include:

Aleksandr Aleksandrovich Blagonravov (1933–2020), Soviet and Russian military engineer and tank designer
Aleksandr Ivanovich Blagonravov (1906–1962), Soviet military engineer and tank designer
Anatoli Blagonravov (1895–1975), Soviet aerospace engineer and diplomat

Russian-language surnames